Linden Woods is a neighbourhood in the Fort Garry area of southwest Winnipeg, Manitoba, Canada.

The first phase of the neighbourhood was designed by IDE (Interdisciplinary Engineering Company) in 1980 and the construction of houses began in 1982. The centrepiece of the neighbourhood is a lake that adjoins Van Walleghem and Muys Parks. Around 2,400 homes, set up in a curvilinear-style typical of new suburbs revolve around the lake. Wilkes Avenue and the Sterling Lyon Parkway form the northern border, McGillivray Boulevard forms the southern border, Waverley Street forms the eastern border and Kenaston Boulevard forms the western border.

Demographics
In 2011, the population of Linden Woods was 10,210. The racial makeup was 74% White, 1.3% Aboriginal and 24.7% being a visible minority; 10% South Asian, 8.3% East Asian, 4.3% Southeast Asian, and the rest fall into another group. Linden Woods is 3.6 km squared, which has a population density of 2,826.2 people per square kilometre.

Linden Woods is one of Winnipeg's wealthier neighbourhoods, with a median household income of $165,000, which is more than double the city's, at $72,000. There are 3,150 dwellings in Linden Woods, worth an average of $460,000. Only 1.1% of dwellings are in need of major repairs, which is about 8 times lower than the city average. 91% of dwellings are owned.

Crime
Linden Woods is a quieter neighbourhood with low crime rates. In 2012, there was only 1 robbery (10.5 per 100,000 residents), 3 motor vehicle thefts (31.4) and 21 break-ins (219.9). All of these rates were significantly lower than the national average; the robbery rate was 8 times lower, the auto-theft rate is 7 times lower, and the break-in rate is half that national rate.

Points of interest and amenities
Schools

Public schools in Linden Woods are operated by the Pembina Trails School Division. In total, there are 3 schools located in Linden Woods:
Van Walleghem School, an elementary and junior high school
Linden Meadows School, an elementary and junior high school
Linden Christian School, a private K-12 Christian school
Parks
 Muys Park
 Van Walleghem Park
 Kleysen Park
Churches
 Grant Memorial Baptist Church
 St. Gianna Roman Catholic Church
Public transportation

The 2006 census reported that 3.4% of the population uses the bus as their primary mode of transportation, which is lower compared to the citywide rate at 14.2%.

, bus routes travelling through Linden Woods include:
 74 - Kenaston
641 - Lindenwoods West
642 - Lindenwoods East
650 - McGillivray
677 - Wilkes

References

Neighbourhoods in Winnipeg
Fort Garry, Winnipeg